A New Thought for Christmas is a 2008 Christmas album (tenth overall studio release) by rock singer Melissa Etheridge, released on September 30, 2008.

Track listing
All songs written by Melissa Etheridge, except where noted.

In the album's liner notes, Etheridge states that although she has never been a religious person, Christmas has always been one of her favorite times of year. She states that the album is her attempt "to bridge our old oppressive cultural ways with the enlightenment of our coming future." The album contains a mix of traditional Christmas songs and original compositions.

2009 re-release deluxe edition DVD track list
On October 26, 2009, Etheridge re-released A New Thought for Christmas as a deluxe package with a concert film DVD produced by Barry Summers from World Live Shows/Rock Fuel Media from the House Of Blues in Atlantic City. The Concert TV Special is broadcast throughout the month of December each year on HDNET/AXIS TV

"Christmas (Baby Please Come Home)"
"Blue Christmas"
"Glorious"
"Have Yourself a Merry Little Christmas"
"Christmas in America"
"Merry Christmas Baby"
"Light a Light"
"Ring the Bells"
"It's Christmas Time"
"O Night Devine"

Charts

References

Melissa Etheridge albums
Island Records albums
2008 Christmas albums
Christmas albums by American artists
Rock Christmas albums
Albums produced by David N. Cole